= Northwest Cove granite =

- Stratigraphic range: Early Silurian – Late Silurian
- Type: Formation
- Unit of: Group

Lithology
- Primary: Plutonic granite

Location
- Region: Newfoundland
- Country: Canada
- Occurrence of the Northwest Cove granite in southeastern Newfoundland

The Northwest Cove granite is a formation cropping out in Newfoundland.
